European Canoe Polo Championships is the main canoe polo championships in Europe.

Summary of championships

See also 
Canoe Polo World Championships
European Canoe Association

References 
Hosts

Polo
Canoe polo
Canoeing and kayaking competitions in Europe